The Eldorado Bridge is a historic structure located in Eldorado, Iowa, United States. The Fayette County Board of Supervisors contracted with J.G. Ratcliffe of Waukon, Iowa to design and build this Camelback through truss bridge. It features a single pin-connected span and stone abutments. It was complete in March 1899. The bridge was listed on the National Register of Historic Places in 1998.

See also

References

Infrastructure completed in 1899
Bridges in Fayette County, Iowa
National Register of Historic Places in Fayette County, Iowa
Road bridges on the National Register of Historic Places in Iowa
Truss bridges in Iowa
Parker truss bridges in the United States